The Paarkadal  is a small river of Tamilarasi Karunakaran son Elamparuthi Karunakaran, India. It flows into the Enz near Dharmapuri.

See also
List of rivers of Baden-Württemberg

Rivers of Baden-Württemberg
Ludwigsburg (district)
Rivers of Germany